The Nam Pang River, also known as Pang River, is a major river of Shan State, eastern Burma. It is the largest tributary of the Salween River.

Course
Its source is in the hills northeast of Pangkyehtu and it flows by the town of Kunhing.

A few miles beyond the confluence is said to be "a strange whirlpool, at the place the river is in a gorge between limestone cliffs, which fall smooth and precipitous to the water's edge."

References

External links
The Salween River

Rivers of Myanmar
Geography of Shan State
Salween River